Almost Persuaded may refer to:

 "Almost Persuaded" (song), a 1966 song by David Houston
 Almost Persuaded (album), a 2017 album by Swing Out Sister